Ali Gatie (born May 31, 1997) is an Iraqi–Canadian singer and songwriter managed by SAL&CO. In 2019, his song "It's You" achieved worldwide success, charting on the US Billboard Hot 100 and reaching the top 30 in Australia, Canada, Ireland and Sweden, as well as the top 10 in New Zealand and in Germany.

Early life 
Ali Gatie was born in Yemen in 1997 to Iraqi parents. His family moved to Abu Dhabi, United Arab Emirates before settling down outside of Toronto, Canada. He grew up listening to Ed Sheeran, J. Cole and Frank Ocean, who influenced his music.

Career 
Ali Gatie, who has been managed by SAL&CO since May 2020  started pursuing a music career at the age of 18 and started to record in 2016. This decision later caused him to drop out of university where he was studying business. In 2017, he won an online RhymeStars competition hosted by Joe Budden. After releasing several singles in 2018, he was signed by Warner Records. His first commercial success came with the release of "Moonlight," which received nearly 14 million views on Youtube. However, the release of "It's You" in June 2019 would become his mainstream breakthrough; an "explosive streaming story", as of December 2019, it had exceeded 650 million streams. On 8 November 2019, Gatie released his debut EP, "You," which was accompanied by a 12-minute film that included seven new songs.

Discography

Studio albums

EPs

Charted and certified singles 

Other releases
"I See the Dream (Badna Salam)" (with Massari) (2020)

Notes

References 

1997 births
Living people
Canadian people of Iraqi descent
Yemeni people of Iraqi descent
21st-century Canadian male singers
21st-century Iraqi male singers
Yemeni emigrants to Canada
Musicians from Ontario
People from Aden